Montmorency is a crime novel and thriller set in Victorian era London, written by Eleanor Updale and published by Scholastic in 2003. It inaugurated the Montmorency series featuring a petty thief who turns gentleman and spy, namely Montmorency and his alter ego Scarper.

The US edition was published in 2004 as Montmorency: thief, liar, gentleman? by the Scholastic imprint Orchard Books.

Plot summary
London, England, 1875. The main character falls through a glass roof onto a grinding machine below while fleeing from the police. Doctor Robert Farcett, hoping to prove himself an accomplished doctor by working on the criminal's complex wounds, saves the thief's life by performing surgery on him. Farcett continues to work on the thief after he is imprisoned and given the temporary name "Prisoner 493". The prisoner has no name other than "Montmorency", which was the name on the bag he had when he was captured. He adopts this name and slowly begins to craft a persona to match.

During his sentence, Montmorency becomes a chief exhibit at the Scientific Society. It is at one of these gatherings that Montmorency comes across Sir Joseph Bazalgette, who is the planner and supervisor of the ongoing London sewer project. Montmorency realises that the sewers are the perfect escape route for his daring robberies. He has high hopes for living as a gentlemen by selling the expensive items he could steal via the sewers. Montmorency realises that rich people do not normally smell like sewer water or wear ratty clothes, he finds himself in need of an accomplice—a fellow thief with knowledge, capability, and secrecy to perform the robberies. He develops a second identity—Scarper—to mask his true identity. Scarper, the thief, poses as a servant to the extravagant and wealthy Montmorency.

Montmorency is released after three years in prison. At this point, all communications between Dr Farcett and Montmorency cease.

Scarper accomplishes many robberies (including burgling Doctor Farcett), and is never caught. During this time, Scarper rents a room in the slums to stash the particularly valuable goods. The place he stays is run by Vi Evans, who later becomes one of Montmorency's close friends. Meanwhile, Montmorency rents a room out at the Marimion Hotel.

The robberies committed by Scarper make the papers. Eventually the police pick up a man named "Freakshow", a friend of Montmorency's from his prison days, and pin Scarper's robberies on him. He is hanged for Scarper's crimes. The hanging becomes a great source of guilt for Montmorency/Scarper.

Outside the Marimion, Montmorency saves George Fox-Selwyn from a carriage accident. He and Fox-Selwyn hit it off immediately and they become friends, and after a bet forces him to put all of his criminal skills to good use breaking into the Mauramanian Embassy to spy for information, Fox-Selwyn gives Montmorency a job as a spy for the British government. His first assignment is to break into the Mauramanian embassy and listen for information that could prevent European war, which earns him a permanent position in the British government.

Eventually, Montmorency sheds the Scarper persona and returns all the stolen goods that remain in his possession, resolving to be an honest man.

Audio
An audiobook was released in the UK in July 2004 read by Stephen Fry.

Theatrical adaptation
A professional theatre company, FreeRange Productions, adapted the novel for stage in 2012, performing at Edinburgh Festival Fringe through August of that year. The show was well received by critics and audiences, and Updale herself described it as "a nerve-wracking, but exciting experience".

References

External links 
 Eleanor Updale (official)
 Montmorency books by Eleanor Updale at WorldCat – print and audio, multiple languages
 FreeRange Productions
 Library Thing page
 Fantastic Fiction page for Eleanor Updale and all her works

2003 British novels
Children's historical novels
British children's novels
Novels set in London
2003 children's books
Scholastic Corporation books